So in Love with You may refer to:
 So in Love with You (Texas song)
 So in Love with You (Duke song)